Caeciliusidae is a family of Psocodea (formerly Psocoptera) belonging to the suborder Psocomorpha. The family was once named Caeciliidae, but the latter name was changed because of homonymy with the amphibian family Caeciliidae. The subfamily Paracaeciliinae was formerly in Caeciliusidae, but it has been elevated to family rank, Paracaeciliidae.

There are at least 40 genera and 650 described species in Caeciliusidae.

Genera
These 40 genera belong to the family Caeciliusidae:

 Amphicaecilius Li, 2002
 Anoculaticaeca Li, 1997
 Aphyopsocus Smithers, 1982
 Asiocaecilius Mockford, 2000
 Austrocaecilius Smithers, 1981
 Bassocaecilius Schmidt & New, 2008
 Bivalvicaecilia Li, 2002
 Caecilius Curtis, 1837
 Clinocaecilius Schmidt & New, 2008
 Coryphaca Enderlein, 1910
 Coryphosmila Enderlein, 1925
 Disialacaecilia Li, 2002
 Dypsocopsis Mockford, 2000
 Dypsocus Hagen, 1866
 Epicaecilius Mockford, 2000
 Fuelleborniella Enderlein, 1902
 Graminacaecilius Schmidt & New, 2008
 Hageniola Banks, 1931
 Isophanes Banks, 1937
 Isophanopsis Badonnel, 1981
 Licaecilius Li, 2002
 Lienhardiella Mockford, 2000
 Maoripsocopsis Mockford, 2000
 Maoripsocus Tillyard, 1923
 Nothocaecilius Schmidt & New, 2008
 Orocaecilius Mockford, 2000
 Parvialacaecilia Li, 2002
 Pericaecilius Mockford, 2000
 Phymocaecilius Li, 2002
 Protodypsocus Enderlein, 1903
 Smithersiella Badonnel, 1977
 Stenocaecilius Mockford, 2000
 Tasmanocaecilius Schmidt & New, 2008
 Thorntoniella Mockford, 2000
 Valenzuela Navas, 1924
 Ypsiloneura Pearman, 1932
 † Eopsocites Hong, 2002
 † Fushunopsocus Hong, 2002
 † Ptenolasia Enderlein, 1911
 † Stenopterites Hong, 2002

Sources

Lienhard, C. & Smithers, C. N. 2002. Psocoptera (Insecta): World Catalogue and Bibliography. Instrumenta Biodiversitatis, vol. 5. Muséum d'histoire naturelle, Genève.

 
Insect families